Philip of Jesus, OFM (Spanish: Felipe de Jesús) was a Novohispanic Franciscan Catholic missionary who became one of the Twenty-six Martyrs of Japan, the first Mexican saint and patron saint of Mexico City.

Philip was born in Mexico City in 1572. Though unusually frivolous as a boy, he joined the Reformed Franciscans of the Province of St. Didacus, founded in Mexico by Peter Baptista, with whom he suffered martyrdom later. After some months in the Order, Philip grew tired of religious life, left the Franciscans in 1589, took up a mercantile career, and went to the Philippines, another Spanish colony, where he led a life of pleasure. Later he desired to re-enter the Franciscans and was again admitted at Manila in 1590.
 
After some years it was determined that he was ready for ordination and sent to Mexico for this, since the episcopal see of Manila was vacant at that time, and thus no bishop was available locally to ordain him. He sailed on the San Felipe on 12 July 1596, but a storm drove the vessel upon the coast of Japan. The governor of the province confiscated the ship and imprisoned its crew and passengers, among whom were another Franciscan friar, Juan de Zamorra, as well as three other friars, two Augustinians and a Dominican. The discovery of soldiers, cannon and ammunition on the ship led to the suspicion that it was intended for the conquest of Japan, and that the missionaries were merely to prepare the way for the soldiers. This was also said, falsely and unwarrantably, by one of the crew, and it enraged the Japanese Taikō, Toyotomi Hideyoshi, generally called Taicosama by Europeans. In consequence, he commanded on  December 8, 1596, the arrest of the Franciscans in the friary at Miako, now Kyoto, whither Philip had gone.
 
The friars were all kept prisoners in the friary until December 30, when they were transferred to the city prison. There were six Franciscan friars, seventeen Japanese  Franciscan tertiaries and the Japanese Jesuit Paul Miki, with his two native servants. The ears of the prisoners were cropped on January 3, 1597, and they were paraded through the streets of Kyoto; on January 21 they were taken to Osaka, and thence to Nagasaki, which they reached on February 5, 1597. They were taken to a mountain near Nagasaki city, "Mount of the Martyrs", bound upon crosses, after which they were pierced with spears.

The bones of Philip were brought to Mexico City in 1598: "Annals of His Time", Chimalpahin.

Beatification & Canonization
Philip was beatified in 1627 by Urban VIII, and, with his companions, canonized 8 June, 1862, by Pius IX. He is the patron saint of the city of Mexico.

In Popular Culture
In 1949 a Mexican film Philip of Jesus portrayed his life and death. It was directed by Julio Bracho with the actor Ernesto Alonso playing Philip.

References

Sources

External links
 http://evangelhoquotidiano.org/main.php?language=PT&module=saintfeast&id=12486&fd=0 (In Portuguese)

1597 deaths
Reformed Franciscans
Japanese Roman Catholic saints
Mexican Roman Catholic saints
Roman Catholic missionaries in Japan
Mexican Roman Catholic missionaries
Mexican people executed abroad
People executed by crucifixion
26 Martyrs of Japan
16th-century Christian saints
1572 births
People of Spanish colonial Philippines
People of New Spain
Catholic Church in the Philippines
Spanish Roman Catholic priests
16th-century Roman Catholic priests
16th-century Spanish people
Franciscan missionaries
Mexican expatriates in Japan
Franciscan saints